Beattys Corner is an unincorporated community in LaPorte County, Indiana, in the United States.

History
John Beatty and his partner started a sawmill in about 1833. Beattys Corner (historically called Beatty's Corners) was laid out and platted in 1842.

References

Unincorporated communities in LaPorte County, Indiana
Unincorporated communities in Indiana